Stevensville is a census-designated place (CDP) in Queen Anne's County, Maryland, United States, and is the county's most populous place among both CDPs and municipalities. The community is the eastern terminus of the Chesapeake Bay Bridge. The Stevensville Historic District is one of two registered historic districts in the county, the other being the Centreville Historic District.

History
Stevensville was founded in 1850 as a steamboat terminal.  Today, the Stevensville Historic District contains roughly 100 historic structures dating back to the town's early days.

In addition to the Stevensville Historic District, the Christ Church, Cray House, Friendship, Legg's Dependence, Mattapax, and Stevensville Bank are listed on the National Register of Historic Places.

On July 24, 2017, an EF2 tornado hit Stevensville, causing damage to homes, trees, and power lines and injuring one person.

Geography
Stevensville is located at  (38.981128, −76.318757).

Climate
The climate in this area is characterized by hot, humid summers and generally mild to cool winters.  According to the Köppen Climate Classification system, Stevensville has a humid subtropical climate, abbreviated "Cfa" on climate maps.

Demographics

As of the census of 2010, there were 6,803 people and 2,644 households residing in the CDP. The population density was 1,057.1 people per square mile. The racial makeup of the CDP was 93.81% White, 2.32% African American, 0.28% American Indian, 1.57% Asian, 0.73% from other races, and 1.57% from two or more races. Hispanic or Latino of any race accounted for 2.85% of the population.

Of 2,396 occupied households, 77.4% had children under the age of 18 living with them, 63.4% were married couples living together, 9.6% had a female householder with no husband present, and 22.6% were non-families. 16.7% of all households were made up of individuals, and 5.1% had someone living alone who was 65 years of age or older. The average household size was 2.84 and the average family size was 3.21.

In the CDP, the population was spread out, with 27.5% under the age of 18, 7.5% from 18 to 24, 26.9% from 25 to 44, 30% from 45 to 64, and 8.1% who were 65 years of age or older. The median age was 39.4 years. For every 100 females, there were 100.8 males.

The American Community Survey estimated the median income for a household in the CDP was $105,023 in 2018 U.S. dollars, and the median income for a family was $107,169. Male householders with no wife present had a median income of $83,389 versus $78,281 for female householders with no husbands present. The per capita income for the CDP was $40,292. About 1.6% of families and 4.3% of the population were below the poverty line, including 0.8% of those under age 18 and 4.5% of those age 65 or over.

Notable people
 Frank E. Petersen, first African-American Marine Corps aviator and the first African-American Marine Corps general
 Brock Adams, former United States Secretary of Transportation and United States senator from Washington
 Edward "E.J." Pipkin, Former Maryland state senator
 Frank Kratovil, former U.S. congressman
 Paul Reed Smith, luthier, founder of PRS Guitars
 Luke Kleintank, actor, most notable for Bones (TV series) and The Man in the High Castle (TV series)

Aviation 
Bay Bridge Airport (W29) is a small, county owned, public landing strip in Stevensville, overlooking the Chesapeake Bay Bridge.  Many private airplanes take off and land there every day.
Kentmorr Airpark (3W3) is a small airpark community adjacent to Kentmorr Marina.

References

Kent Island, Maryland
Census-designated places in Queen Anne's County, Maryland
Census-designated places in Maryland
Populated places established in 1850
1850 establishments in Maryland
Maryland populated places on the Chesapeake Bay